Ti Jean Quinto is a cruel loa who lives under bridges and assumes the shape of a police officer in Vodou.

Voodoo gods